Heinrich XXIV, Count Reuss of Ebersdorf (22 January 1724, in Ebersdorf – 13 May 1779, in Ebersdorf), was ruler of the German county Reuss-Ebersdorf from 1747 until his death in 1779.

He was the eldest son of the thirteen children of Heinrich XXIX, Count of Reuss-Ebersdorf and Sophie Theodora of Castell-Remlingen. He was the grandfather of King Leopold I of Belgium and the great-grandfather of Queen Victoria (through his daughter Augusta).

Heinrich XXIV succeeded his father as Count of Reuss-Ebersdorf in 1747.

Family
In Thurnau on 28 June 1754 Heinrich XXIV married Countess Karoline Ernestine of Erbach-Schönberg. They had seven children: 

Heinrich XLVI (b. Ebersdorf, 14 May 1755 — d. Ebersodrf, 18 April 1757).
Augusta (b. Ebersdorf, 9 January 1757 — d. Coburg, 16 November 1831), Princess of Reuss-Ebersdorf (German: Prinzessin Reuß zu Ebersdorf) on 9 April 1806; married on 13 June 1777 to Duke Franz of Saxe-Coburg-Saalfeld.
Luise (b. Ebersdorf, 2 June 1759 — d. Lobenstein, 5 December 1840), Princess of Reuss-Ebersdorf (German: Prinzessin Reuß zu Ebersdorf) on 9 April 1806; married on 1 June 1781 to Prince Heinrich XLIII of Reuss-Köstritz.
Heinrich LI (b. Ebersdorf, 16 May 1761 — d. Ebersdorf, 10 July 1822), became Prince of Reuss-Ebersdorf (German: Fürst Reuß zu Ebersdorf) on 9 April 1806.
Ernestine Ferdinande (b. Ebersdorf, 28 April 1762 — d. Ebersdorf, 19 May 1763).
Heinrich LIII (b. Ebersdorf, 24 May 1765 — d. Ebersdorf, 28 June 1770).
Henriette (b. Ebersdorf, 9 May 1767 — d. Coburg, 3 September 1801), married on 4 July 1787 to Prince Karl of Leiningen-Dagsburg-Hartenburg.

Ancestry

References 
 Thomas Gehrlein: "Das Haus Reuss: Älterer und Jüngerer Linie", booklet, August 2006

1724 births
1779 deaths
People from Saalburg-Ebersdorf
House of Reuss
German princes